Benito Urteaga was a Marxist revolutionary and guerrilla from Argentina. He was born in 1946 and was killed on 19 July 1976. After Mario Roberto Santucho, he was the second most important person of ERP. He was killed together with Mario Roberto Santucho by military forces in Buenos Aires in 1976.

References
 Mario Roberto Santucho (1936-1976) 

1946 births
1976 deaths
Argentine people of Basque descent
Argentine revolutionaries
Deaths by firearm in Argentina
People from San Nicolás de los Arroyos
Argentine Marxists